This is a list of newspapers in Arkansas, USA.

Daily newspapers and Online Publications (currently published)

Weekly newspapers (currently published)

University newspapers
 The Arkansas Traveler — University of Arkansas, Fayetteville
 The Echo – University of Central Arkansas, Conway
 The Herald – Arkansas  State University, Jonesboro
 The Arka Tech — Arkansas Tech University, Russellville
 The Oracle — Henderson State University, Arkadelphia

Defunct

See also
 Arkansas media
 List of radio stations in Arkansas
 List of television stations in Arkansas
 Media of cities in Arkansas: Fayetteville, Fort Smith, Hot Springs, Little Rock, Rogers
 Journalism:
 :Category:Journalists from Arkansas
 University of Arkansas, Walter Lemke Department of Journalism in Fayetteville
 Arkansas literature

References

Bibliography
 
 
 
 
 
 
 
 
 
  (Includes information about newspapers)
 
 

External links

 
 . (Includes bibliography)
 
  (Directory ceased in 2017)